The  is a DC electric multiple unit (EMU) rubber-tyred metro train type operated by Sapporo Municipal Subway on the Tōhō Line in the city of Sapporo, Japan, since 8 May 2015.

Design
The trains are built by Kawasaki Heavy Industries in Kobe and have aluminium bodies.

Formations
The 9000 series trains are formed as four-car sets as shown below, consisting of two motored intermediate cars and two non-powered driving trailer cars. The Tc1 car is at the Sakaemachi end.

The two intermediate motor cars each have one single-arm pantograph.

Interior
Passenger accommodation consists of longitudinal bench seating, with a wheelchair space in each car.

History
The order for the fleet of new trains was placed with Kawasaki Heavy Industries in April 2013 at a cost of approximately 12 billion yen (excluding bogies and other equipment ordered separately), and the first trainset was unveiled to the media in November 2014. It entered revenue service on 8 May 2015.

References

External links

 Official press release (31 October 2014) 

Electric multiple units of Japan
Sapporo Municipal Subway
Train-related introductions in 2015
Kawasaki multiple units
1500 V DC multiple units of Japan